The enzyme chorismate synthase (EC 4.2.3.5) catalyzes the chemical reaction

5-O-(1-carboxyvinyl)-3-phosphoshikimate  chorismate + phosphate

This enzyme belongs to the family of lyases, specifically those carbon-oxygen lyases acting on phosphates.  The systematic name of this enzyme class is 5-O-(1-carboxyvinyl)-3-phosphoshikimate phosphate-lyase (chorismate-forming). This enzyme is also called 5-O-(1-carboxyvinyl)-3-phosphoshikimate phosphate-lyase.  This enzyme participates in phenylalanine, tyrosine and tryptophan biosynthesis.

Chorismate synthase catalyzes the last of the seven steps in the shikimate pathway which is used in prokaryotes, fungi and plants for the biosynthesis of aromatic amino acids. It catalyzes the 1,4-trans elimination of the phosphate group from 5-enolpyruvylshikimate-3-phosphate (EPSP) to form chorismate which can then be used in phenylalanine, tyrosine or tryptophan biosynthesis. Chorismate synthase requires the presence of a reduced flavin mononucleotide (FMNH2 or FADH2) for its activity. Chorismate synthase from various sources shows a high degree of sequence conservation. It is a protein of about 360 to 400 amino-acid residues.

Biological and practical function

The shikimate pathway synthesises aromatic amino acids as well as other aromatic compounds that have various involvement with processes such as "UV protection, electron transport, signaling, communication, plant defense, and the wound response".
Moreover, the enzymes catalysing the Shikimate pathway may be potentially useful in the development of new herbicides and antibiotics.  This is due to the fact that the shikimate pathway is not present in humans. It is, therefore, an ideal target for herbicides because chemicals used to inhibit the shikimate pathway should not have an effect on humans. Also, the products created by the shikimate pathway are essential to plant life, so, if the function of the pathway is inhibited, this has a fatal effect on the plant.
The enzymes in the shikimate pathway, and chorismate synthase specifically,are also considered to be potential targets for new antimicrobial chemotherapy treatments for Mycobacterium tuberculosis.  This is important since drugs resistant strains of M. tuberculosis continue to emerge.  Studies have shown that the "shikimate pathway is essential for M. tuberculosis viability" making it an attractive target for new antimycobacterial agents.

Structural studies

The crystal structure of chorismate synthase is a homotetramer with one
FMN molecule non-covalently bound to each of the four monomers.  
Each monomer is made up of 9 alpha helices and 18 beta strands and the core 
is assembled in a unique beta-alpha-beta sandwich fold. The active sites for FMN-binding are made up of clusters of flexible loops and the area around these regions have highly positive electromagnetic potential. There are two histidine residues located at the active site which are thought to protonate the reduced flavin molecule and the leaving phosphate group of the substrate.

Mechanism

Reduced flavin (FMN) transfers an electron to the substrate resulting in cleavage of the C--O bond.  How this flavin is obtained differs from one organism to another and the process is not completely understood. Following the binding of EPSP, the flavin reaction intermediate is formed, but this process is completed prior to EPSP consumption.  After EPSP has been converted to chorismate, and after the phosphate has been released from the enzyme,then the flavin intermediate will decay. The chorismate synthase enzyme can be divided into two categories based on how reduced FMN is obtained.  Bifunctional chorismate synthase is present in fungi and  require a "second enzymatic activity, an NAD(P)H-dependent flavin reductase"." Monofunctional chorismate synthase is found in plants and E.coli and is only active in an anaerobic environment with "chemically or enzymatically reduced flavin".
There is no net redox change in the reaction. The flavin molecule is not consumed during the reaction and merely acts as a catalyst.

References

External links

EC 4.2.3
Enzymes of known structure